McFarland High School is a high school located in McFarland, in Dane County, Wisconsin. It is administered by the McFarland School District. The school's colors are Columbia blue, navy blue, and white and the mascot is the Spartan.

Academics
McFarland High School offers twelve AP (Advanced Placement) classes: calculus AB, calculus BC, physics, chemistry, biology, psychology, composition, literature, U.S. history, U.S. government, economics, and European history.

The school year is divided into two semesters, each about eighteen weeks long. McFarland High School uses block scheduling, with the school day consisting of four 85 minute blocks. The schedule was changed for the 2014-2015 school year to an AB schedule. The AB schedule is similar to the block schedule. However, instead four quarters of four classes each, it was split up into two semesters of eight classes each with four classes on A-day and four classes on B-day.

In 2016, a referendum to fund facility improvements was approved by voters. The referendum includes, a new baseball complex, auditorium, track, aquatic pool, and artificial turf for the football field. The football field, track, and baseball complex were completed in 2018. A new pool and auditorium were completed in 2019.

Extracurricular activities 

Clubs at the McFarland High School include:

 Eco Club
 Ambassadors
eSports
 Art Studio
 PACPack
 Black Student Union (BSU)
Blue Notes (Advanced Vocal Music Ensemble)
 DECA
 Drama
 Gay–straight alliance
 Girl Up
 Model United Nations
 Musical
 National Honor Society
 Newspaper (Spartan Spotlight)
 Driftwood (literary publication)
 Science Olympiad
 Social Studies in Action
 Spirit Dance Team
 Student Council
 T.A.D.A.
 Tutoring Program
Ultimate Frisbee
 Yearbook

The 2007 marching band was composed of more than 200 musicians. Concert band, jazz band, choir, and vocal jazz are also offered at McFarland.

Athletics
Since the 2008-09 school year, McFarland teams have competed in the WIAA Rock Valley Conference. The swim team is an exception because the Rock Valley Conference has no swimming program.

In 2008-2009, the McFarland football team had a 9-0 record and won the Rock Valley Conference. The girls' tennis team and both cross country teams also won their respective Rock Valley Conference titles that season. The boys' swimming team has won six consecutive Division II state titles, from 2007 to 2012, and was the runner-up in 2003 and 2014. The boys' golf team earned the state title once and runner-up twice for five years. The team has been in the state tournament the last nine years, and won the sectional tournament three years in a row. Girls' soccer took a second-place finish in the 2007 state games. The McFarland boys' track team won the WIAA Division 2 regionals. Boys' soccer lost in the state semi-finals in 2013, the McFarland boys' first state appearance in school history. In 2018, McFarland’s Boys Soccer team went to the Division 3 State Championship, but lost to Pius XI Catholic from Milwaukee.

References

External links
 McFarland High School
 

Schools in Dane County, Wisconsin
Public high schools in Wisconsin
Educational institutions established in 1962